Recaş can be:

 Recaș, town in Timiș County, Banat, Romania
 Recaș River, tributary of the Valea Cărăşiţa River in Romania
 ACS Recaș, Romanian professional football club from Recaş, Timiș County

Recas 
 Recas, municipality located in the province of Toledo, Castile-La Mancha, Spain

See also 
 Reca (disambiguation)